Jutrzenka may refer to:

 Jutrzenka Kraków, a Jewish minority Polish football club during the interwar period
 Jutrzenka Polonia Bydgoszcz, speedway team
 Jutrzenka, Lubusz Voivodeship, a village in western Poland
 Jutrzenka, Pomeranian Voivodeship, a village in northern Poland